Fordham's Accommodation are underground parallel chambers within the Rock of Gibraltar built during the Second World War. These are part of the extensive tunnels of Gibraltar. The chambers were named after Colonel H M Fordham OBE, MC, who was Chief Engineer in Gibraltar. The chambers were based on Liddell's Union Tunnel.

Description
The tunnel is named after Colonel H M Fordham OBE, MC, who was the Chief Engineer in Gibraltar from 1940 to 1941. The chambers were constructed by enlarging the original Liddell's Union Tunnel which extends southward to the Calpe Hospital chambers which were used by both civilian and military patients. Although at this point only essential civilians were allowed in Gibraltar with the rest having been evacuated.

The purpose of the World War II tunnelling project in Gibraltar was to provide sufficient accommodation to enable a garrison of 16,000 to live underground and resist a siege for a period of up to a year. Therefore, the accommodation had to include a water supply, electric light and power, sanitary arrangements, hospital and laundry in addition to the normal accommodation of personnel.  The overall accommodation capacity in this section of tunnels was 6,000.

Chambers allowed the construction of buildings which were either standard army huts (typically Nissen huts, Iris huts or Romney huts) or buildings made of concrete block walls and normal roof trusses. The buildings protected people from annoying drips and the occasional fall of small rocks. Frosted glass windows helped the occupants feel a sense of normality despite being deep underground.

In all chambers two feet of clear air space all round the building was allowed. This space was essential so that water seeping through the rock could drain away through the drainage channels provided; it also permitted air circulation around the buildings, and facilitated periodic inspection of the rock face.

In the early days. spans up to  had been cut with flat roofs, but these gave endless trouble from rock falls, particularly when further excavations were being carried out in the vicinity.

In planning economically, the aim was to reduce the access tunnelling to the minimum. Chambers leading directly off the main tunnel, were generally used, with a passing bay provided to avoid congestion or, even better, with a service tunnel. These tunnels were excavated using diamond drills and gelignite. The drill holes were placed over two metres apart armed with a pound of gelignite per metre depth of drilled hole. This was a fast way of tunnelling but in retrospect it may have used too much explosive as the remaining rock around tunnels of this era are unstable and rock falls have killed people.

These joining tunnels prevented the chambers from becoming damp and unusable as these connections were essential to allow for the circulation of air assisting in keeping the chambers well ventilated.

Chambers were also cut parallel to the main tunnel. Small communication tunnels, however, up to  span, were crossed with only  between the roof of the lower tunnel and the floor of the higher. The tunnel design had to be prepared carefully and tunnels were included even though the plan for their use was unclear. This was because it was difficult to add extensions, because the subsequent blasting would have damaged the completed chambers and their fittings.

References
This article contains text from the Discover-Gibraltar site.

Tunnels in Gibraltar